Wu Shenghua (born October 1966) is a Chinese politician of Bouyei ethnicity currently serving as party secretary of Bijie.

He was an alternate member of the 19th Central Committee of the Chinese Communist Party.  He is a representative of the 20th National Congress of the Chinese Communist Party and an alternate member of the 20th Central Committee of the Chinese Communist Party. He was a delegate to the 13th National People's Congress.

Biography
Wu was born in Duyun, Guizhou, in October 1966. In 1984, he entered Guizhou Agricultural University (now Guizhou University), majoring in agronomy. 

After graduating in 1988, he was assigned to Luodian County, where he eventually becoming deputy magistrate in June 1997 and executive deputy magistrate in January 2000. He joined the Chinese Communist Party (CCP) in July 1994. He became magistrate of Guiding County in September 2004, and then party secretary, the top political position in the county, beginning in November 2005. In February 2007, he became vice governor of Qiannan Bouyei and Miao Autonomous Prefecture, rising to governor in February 2017. He also served as deputy party secretary, secretary of the Political and Legal Affairs Commission, president of the Party School, and secretary of the Party Working Committee of Duyun Economic Development Zone. He was appointed vice governor of Guizhou in October 2020 and in April 2022 was admitted to member of the Standing Committee of the CCP Guizhou Provincial Committee, the province's top authority. In May 2022, he was transferred to Bijie and appointed party secretary.

References

1966 births
Living people
Bouyei people
People from Duyun
Guizhou University alumni
People's Republic of China politicians from Guizhou
Chinese Communist Party politicians from Guizhou
Alternate members of the 19th Central Committee of the Chinese Communist Party
Alternate members of the 20th Central Committee of the Chinese Communist Party
Delegates to the 13th National People's Congress
Governors of Qiannan Buyei and Miao Autonomous Prefecture